Samuel Boulanger (May 8, 1909  July 13, 1989) was a Canadian politician, agrologist, manager, manufacturer and teacher. He was elected to the House of Commons of Canada in 1957 as an Independent Liberal to represent the riding of Drummond—Arthabaska. He joined the Liberal Party and was elected in 1958. He was defeated in the elections of 1962 and in 1965, the last as an independent.

External links
 

1909 births
1989 deaths
People from Chaudière-Appalaches
Independent Liberal MPs in Canada
Independent MPs in the Canadian House of Commons
Liberal Party of Canada MPs
Members of the House of Commons of Canada from Quebec